Right-Believing, also called under the prefix The most Orthodox, is an Orthodox saint title for monarchs who were canonized for a righteous life. They do not belong to martyrs or passion bearers. The saint title was initially given to Byzantine Emperors and their wives by the Constantinople Orthodox Church in the period of Ecumenical Councils, but other local Orthodox churches took that tradition, including the Russian Orthodox Church. Russian Right-Believing princes include Andrey Bogolyubsky, Davyd Yuryevich Alexander Nevsky,   and Dmitry Donskoy. Ukrainian Right-Believing leaders include Petro Konashevych-Sahaidachny.

See also 
 List of Eastern Orthodox saint titles

Literature 
 
 The Right-Believing

References

Christian terminology
Eastern Orthodox liturgy
Types of saints